The Washington D.C. Area Film Critics Association Award for Best Breakthrough Performance or Best Youth Performance is one of the annual awards given by the Washington D.C. Area Film Critics Association.

Winners

2000s

2010s

2020s

Notes

Breakthrough Performance, Best